Frumoasa may refer to several places in Romania:

 Frumoasa, Harghita, a commune in Harghita County
 Frumoasa, Teleorman, a commune in Teleorman County
 Frumoasa, a village in Balcani Commune, Bacău County
 Frumoasa, a village in Moara Commune, Suceava County
 Frumoasa Monastery
 Frumoasa, a tributary of the Valea Locii in Iași County
 Frumoasa (Olt), a tributary of the Racul in Harghita County
 Frumoasa, a tributary of the Șomuzul Mare in Suceava County
 Frumoasa, a tributary of the Tazlău in Bacău County
 Dolia Frumoasă, a tributary of the Rudăreasa in Vâlcea County
 Valea Frumoasă, a tributary of the Borumlaca in Bihor County

and one place in Moldova:

 Frumoasa, Călărași, a commune in Călărași District